Newsham is a village and civil parish in the Richmondshire district of North Yorkshire, England.

History 
The settlement of Newsham predates the Domesday Book, although the name of the village derives from the Old English nēowan hūsum, which means New Houses. At the time of the Norman Conquest, Newsham belonged to Sprot and Ulfkil. After the Domesday Book assessment, the land was in the hands of Count Alan and later passed to Minotts (of Carlton Miniott) in 1285 and then being seized by the Markenfield family by 1497.

During the Stuart and Tudor periods, the village was regarded as quite important due to its market, of which the grade II listed market cross still exists, having been erected in the 16th century. Another grade II listed building in the village is Newsham Hall, now a farmhouse, it once housed a boarding school in the early 19th century.

In 1870-72 John Marius Wilson's Imperial Gazetteer of England and Wales described Newsham as:"a township and a sub-district in Richmond district, N. R. Yorkshire. The township lies 8 miles N W of Richmond, and is in Kirkby-Ravensworth and Barningham parishes. Acres, 3, 312. Real property, £3, 974. Pop. in 1851, 434; in 1861, 366. Houses, 84. Pop. of the Kirkby-Ravensworth portion, in 1851, 333; in 1861, 283. Houses, 61. Much of the surfaceis moor and woodland.—The sub-district contains also seven other townships. Acres, 16, 481. Pop., 1, 413. Houses, 313."

Governance
Now a separate parish, Newsham was formerly part of the Kirkby Ravensworth, which also included Dalton, Gayles and Whashton. The village lies within the Richmond (Yorks) parliamentary constituency, which is under the control of the Conservative Party. The current Member of Parliament, since the 2015 general election, is Rishi Sunak. Newsham is part of the Richmondshire District Council electoral ward of Gilling West.

Community and culture 
Newsham has a village hall and a village green, on which an annual carnival takes place in May/June. The village was once home to a public house, The Pipes Tavern, however it has since closed, the Smallways Country Inn and the Rokeby Inn (formerly the A66 Motel) are less than a mile north of the village on a junction with the A66 road.

References

External links

Villages in North Yorkshire
Civil parishes in North Yorkshire